Lionel Jr. "L. J." Figueroa Mercado (born March 28, 1998) is a Dominican and American professional basketball player for the South Bay Lakers of the NBA G League. He played college basketball for the Odessa Wranglers, the St. John's Red Storm, and the Oregon Ducks.

High school career
As a freshman, Figueroa played basketball for Notre Dame Cristo Rey High School in Lawrence, Massachusetts. For his sophomore season, he transferred to Lawrence High School in Lawrence to seek better competition but was relegated to junior varsity. He then transferred to Oldsmar Christian School in Oldsmar, Florida, where he repeated his sophomore year and grew four inches (10 cm). Figueroa was drawn there by coach Alex Arias. For his senior season, he moved to West Oaks Academy in Orlando, Florida. Figueroa was a four-star recruit and committed to play college basketball for New Mexico State over offers from Florida, Miami (Florida) and Louisville, among others.

College career
Before playing a game for New Mexico State, Figueroa left the program due to a coaching change. He played for Odessa College during his freshman season. Figueroa averaged 21.4 points, 5.5 rebounds and 3.7 assists per game, while shooting 48.2 percent from three-point range, and earned First Team National Junior College Athletic Association Division I All-American honors. He was also named Western Junior College Athletic Conference (WJCAC) Player of the Year and Freshman of the Year.

For his sophomore season, Figueroa transferred to St. John's. On November 27, 2018, he scored a sophomore season-high 25 points and collected 13 rebounds in an 85–64 win against Maryland Eastern Shore. As a sophomore, Figueroa averaged 14.4 points, 6.4 rebounds and 1.7 assists per game. He entered the transfer portal following the departure of coach Chris Mullin before returning to St. John's. On January 25, 2020, Figueroa scored a junior season-high 28 points with seven three-pointers in a 79–66 win over DePaul. As a junior, he averaged 14.5 points, 4.5 rebounds, 2.1 assists and a Big East-leading 1.9 steals per game. However, Figueroa struggled with his shooting under new coach Mike Anderson, making 37.9 percent of his attempts from the floor.

After initially declaring for the 2020 NBA draft, Figueroa decided to return to college and transfer to Oregon for his senior season. He was granted a waiver for immediate eligibility on December 3. As a senior, Figueroa averaged 12.3 points and a team-high 6.1 rebounds per game, while finishing third on the team with 41 steals. Following the season, he opted to turn professional rather than take advantage of the additional season of eligibility the NCAA granted due to the COVID-19 pandemic.

Professional career
After going undrafted in the 2021 NBA draft, Figueroa joined the Dallas Mavericks for NBA Summer League play.

Leones de Santo Domingo (2021)
In August, he signed with Leones de Santo Domingo of the Dominican Liga Nacional de Baloncesto, helping them win the LNB Championship.

Santa Cruz Warriors (2021–2022)
On October 13, 2021, Figueroa signed with the Golden State Warriors. However, he was waived three days later. In October 2021, Figueroa joined the Santa Cruz Warriors as an affiliate player. On January 10, 2022, he had 17 points and 13 rebounds and hit the game-winning basket at the buzzer in a 132–130 overtime win over the Memphis Hustle.

South Bay Lakers (2022–present)
On October 8, 2022, Figueroa signed with the Los Angeles Lakers. He was waived two days later.

On October 22, 2022, Figueroa joined the South Bay Lakers training camp roster.

National team career
Figueroa represented the Dominican Republic at the 2016 FIBA Americas Under-18 Championship, averaging 14.6 points and 5.2 rebounds per game. He played for the Dominican Republic at the 2019 Pan American Games.

Career statistics

College

NCAA Division I

|-
| style="text-align:left;"| 2018–19
| style="text-align:left;"| St. John's
| 34 || 32 || 32.0 || .513 || .383 || .627 || 6.4 || 1.7 || 1.8 || .2 || 14.4
|-
| style="text-align:left;"| 2019–20
| style="text-align:left;"| St. John's
| 32 || 32 || 28.3 || .379 || .365 || .663 || 4.5 || 2.1 || 1.9 || .5 || 14.5
|-
| style="text-align:left;"| 2020–21
| style="text-align:left;"| Oregon
| 26 || 21 || 31.3 || .467 || .377 || .667 || 6.1 || 1.4 || 1.6 || .3 || 12.3
|- class="sortbottom"
| style="text-align:center;" colspan="2"| Career
| 92 || 85 || 30.5 || .449 || .374 || .651 || 5.6 || 1.8 || 1.8 || .3 || 13.9

JUCO

|-
| style="text-align:left;"| 2017–18
| style="text-align:left;"| Odessa
| 33 || 32 || 24.2 || .555 || .482 || .726 || 5.5 || 3.7 || 1.2 || .4 || 21.4

Personal life
Figueroa is the son of Leo Figueroa and Gleny Mercado. His mother played volleyball for Florida Memorial College.

References

External links
Oregon Ducks bio
St. John's Red Storm bio
Odessa Wranglers bio

1998 births
Living people
American men's basketball players
American sportspeople of Dominican Republic descent
Basketball players from Massachusetts
Dominican Republic men's basketball players
Odessa Wranglers men's basketball players
Oregon Ducks men's basketball players
Santa Cruz Warriors players
Shooting guards
Small forwards
Sportspeople from Lawrence, Massachusetts
St. John's Red Storm men's basketball players